George Bowman, or Bo Mun Soen sa Nim, is a Zen master and licensed psychotherapist living at Furnace Mountain in Clay City, Kentucky (he does not teach there). He received Dharma transmission from Seung Sahn Soen Sa Nim in 1992, and is a former teacher in the Kwan Um School of Zen. He was a founding member of the Providence Zen Center in 1972 and also did koan study with Joshu Sasaki from 1977 to 2003. Furnace Mountain is run by Dae Gak Soen Sa Nim—another former Kwan Um line teacher. He was a resident teacher at the Cambridge Buddhist Association from 1991 to 1999, and in 1994 became a guiding teacher of the Institute for Meditation and Psychotherapy. Today he travels to Boston, Massachusetts most months to lead a "floating zendo" named the Single Flower Sangha. Bowman has given inka to his student David Dayan Rynick, who was the first individual to be acknowledged as a teacher outside of the Kwan Um lineage.

See also
Dae Gak
Furnace Mountain
Providence Zen Center
Kyozan Joshu Sasaki
List of Rinzai Buddhists
Timeline of Zen Buddhism in the United States

Notes

References

Further reading

Rinzai Buddhists
Seon Buddhists
Kwan Um School of Zen
Zen Buddhist spiritual teachers
American Zen Buddhists
Living people
Year of birth missing (living people)